The TUM School of Natural Sciences (NAT) is a school of the Technical University of Munich, established in 2022 by the merger of various former departments. As of 2022, it is structured into the Department of Biosciences, the Department of Chemistry, and the Department of Physics. The school is located at the Garching campus.

Department of Chemistry

History

Chairs 
As of 2020, the department consists of 24 chairs and institutes:
 Analytical Chemistry and Water Chemistry
 Inorganic Chemistry
 Inorganic and Organometallic Chemistry
 Inorganic Chemistry with Focus on New Materials
 Construction Chemistry
 Construction Chemicals
 Biochemistry
 Biomolecular NMR-Spectroscopy
 Biophysical Chemistry
 Biotechnology
 Food Chemistry
 Macromolecular Chemistry
 Medicinal and Bioinorganic Chemistry
 Organic Chemistry
 Pharmaceutical Radiochemistry
 Physical Chemistry
 Silicon Chemistry
 Synthetic Biotechnology
 Technical Electrochemistry
 Chemical Technology
 Theoretical Chemistry

Department of Physics

History 

Physics was one of the founding disciplines of the Polytechnische Schule München in 1868, with the establishment of the Physikalisches Cabinet, later called the Physikalisches Institut. In 1902, the Laboratorium für Technische Physik (technical physics) was founded, spearheaded by Carl von Linde. In 1943, another institute, the Institut für Theoretische Physik (theoretical physics) was founded. In 1965, the three physics institutes were finally combined into the Department of Physics, as it exists today.

Research groups 
As of 2020, the main research areas the TUM Department of Physics are biophysics, nuclei, particles, astrophysics, and condensed matter. The following research groups currently exist:

 Applied Quantum Field Theory
 Biomedical Physics
 Biomolecular Nano-Technology
 Cellular Biophysics
 Chemical Physics Beyond Equilibrium
 Collective Quantum Dynamics
 Dark Matter
 Dense and Strange Hadronic Matter
 Experimental Astro-Particle Physics
 Experimental Physics of Functional Spin Systems
 Experimental Physics with Cosmic Particles
 Experimental Semiconductor Physics
 Functional Materials
 Fundamental Particle Physics at Low Energies
 Hadronic Structure and Fundamental Symmetries
 Laser and X-Ray Physics
 Many Particle Phenomena
 Molecular Biophysics
 Molecular Dynamics
 Molecular Engineering at Functional Interfaces
 Nanotechnology and Nanomaterials
 Neutron Scattering
 Nuclear Astrophysics
 Observational Cosmology
 Physics of Biomedical Imaging
 Physics of Energy Conversion and Storage
 Physics of Surfaces and Interfaces
 Physics of Synthetic Biological Systems
 Plasma Surface and Divertor Physics
 Precision Measurements at Extreme Conditions
 Quantum Matter
 Quantum Technologies
 Semiconductor Nanostructures and Quantum Systems
 Soft Matter Physics
 Structure and Dynamics of Molecular Machines
 Technical Physics
 Theoretical Biophysics of Neuronal Information Processing
 Theoretical Elementary Particle Physics
 Theoretical Particle Physics at Colliders
 Theoretical Particle and Nuclear Physics
 Theoretical Physics of the Early Universe
 Theoretical Solid-State Physics
 Theory of Biological Networks
 Theory of Complex Bio-Systems
 Theory of Functional Energy Materials
 Theory of Quantum Matter and Nanophysics
 Topology of Correlated Systems

Rankings 

The Department of Chemistry is regarded as one of the best chemistry departments in Germany. In the QS rankings it is ranked No. 22 in the world and No. 1 in Germany. In the ARWU rankings, it is ranked No. 51–75 in the world. In the national 2020 CHE University Ranking, the department is rated in the top group for the majority of criteria, including teaching, study organization, and overall study situation.

The Department of Physics is ranked 1st in Germany and 16th in the world in the QS World University Rankings. The Academic Ranking of World Universities rank the department within No. 7–9 in Germany and No. 101–150 in the world.

The Times Higher Education World University Rankings does not rank individual subjects, though in the physical sciences TUM is generally ranked 23rd globally and 1st nationally.

Notable people 
7 laureates of the Nobel Prize in Chemistry have studied, taught or researched at TUM:
 1927 – Heinrich Otto Wieland (bile acids)
 1930 – Hans Fischer (constitution and synthesis of haemin and chlorophyll)
 1973 – Ernst Otto Fischer (sandwich complexes)
 1988 – Johann Deisenhofer and Robert Huber (crystal structure of an integral membrane protein)
 2007 – Gerhard Ertl (chemical processes on solid surfaces)
 2017 – Joachim Frank (cryo-electron microscopy)

6 laureates of the Nobel Prize in Physics have studied, taught or researched at TUM:
 1961 – Rudolf L. Mößbauer (Mößbauer effect)
 1985 – Klaus von Klitzing (quantum Hall effect)
 1986 – Ernst Ruska (electron microscope)
 1989 – Wolfgang Paul (ion trap)
 2001 – Wolfgang Ketterle (Bose-Einstein condensation in dilute gases of alkali atoms)
 2022 – Anton Zeilinger (quantum information science)

References 

 
2022 establishments in Germany
Educational institutions established in 2022
Physics departments